Stylianos of Paphlagonia (Latin: Stylianus, Greek: Στυλιανός, English: Stylian), also known as Stylianos the Hermit, is venerated as a saint from Adrianopolis in the province of Paphlagonia (modern Turkey).

Life

Stylianos of Paphlagonia was born in Adrianopolis sometime between 400 AD and 500 AD. He distributed his inheritance among the poor, and left the city to live in a monastery. His zealous devotion and asceticism provoked jealousy on the part of other monks, so he left the monastery to live as a hermit in a cave in the wilderness, where he spent his time in prayer and fasting. There, in the peace of the desert, the Stylianos had time to observe creation and meditate upon it, and he saw the Creator in all things. His holiness evident to the people of the surrounding area, and they came to listen to his teaching, or to be cured by through his prayers. He knew how to calm troubled souls; other ascetics came to join him.

Stylianos is known for his smiling countenance and cheerful disposition. He would periodically leave his hermitage and make pastoral visits to neighboring villages.

Stylianos was also known for his love of children. He believed that for a person to be saved, they needed to have their soul like that of a little child. Sometimes parents would leave their children with for a period of time in order for them to receive some spiritual guidance.<ref>[http://web.mit.edu/ocf/www/stylianos.html "St Stylianus", Orthodox Weekly Bulletin, Cliffwood, New Jersey]</ref>  

He is celebrated for the gift of healing children by his prayers. Parents would travel great distances seeking a cure for their offspring, which Stylianos attributed to the holy name of God. He also acquired the reputation of a wonder-worker because his prayers seemed to help childless couples have a child.

Even after his death, the people of Paphlagonia believed that he could cure their children. Whenever a child became sick, an icon of Saint Stylianos was painted and hung over the child’s bed.

Veneration
Saint Stylianos is commemorated on 26 November.

Patronage
Saint Stylianos is known as a protector of children, especially orphans. Pious Christians invoke him to help and protect their children; childless women entreat his intercession so that they might have children.

Iconography
Saint Stylianos is depicted in iconography holding an swaddled infant in his arms.

Historicity   
The Bollandist Hippolyte Delehaye argued that Stylianos never existed, but was a confusion with Alypios the Stylite, who shares a saint's day and city of birth, with the attribute 'stylite' being confused with a cognomen Στυλιανός (both derived from στύλος 'pillar').

Notes

Sources
 Poulos, The Rev. George, Orthodox Saints'', Orthodox Press (1986)

External links
 Katolsk.no: Stylianos of Adrianople

6th-century Christian saints
6th-century Byzantine monks
Byzantine saints
Byzantine Paphlagonians
Eastern Orthodox saints
People from Karabük Province